A Square Deal is a 1917 American silent drama film directed by Harley Knoles and starring Carlyle Blackwell, June Elvidge and Henry Hull.

Cast
 Carlyle Blackwell as Hugh Eltinge 
 June Elvidge as Doris Golden 
 Henry Hull as Mark Dunbar 
 Muriel Ostriche as Ruby Trailes 
 Charlotte Granville as Mrs. Trailes 
 Charles W. Charles as Hans

References

Bibliography
 Goble, Alan. The Complete Index to Literary Sources in Film. Walter de Gruyter, 1999.

External links
 

1917 films
1917 drama films
1910s English-language films
American silent feature films
Silent American drama films
Films directed by Harley Knoles
American black-and-white films
World Film Company films
1910s American films